Eutropis beddomei, commonly known as Beddome's mabuya or Beddome's skink, is a species of lizard in the family Scincidae. The species is native to India and Sri Lanka.

Etymology
E. beddomei is named after Richard Henry Beddome, 1830-1911, British army officer and botanist.

Description
Boulenger (1890) described E. beddomei as follows:

"Snout short, obtuse. Lower eyelid scaly. Nostril behind vertical of suture between rostral and first labial; no postnasal; anterior loreal deeper and shorter than the second, in contact with the first labial; supranasals in contact behind the rostral; frontonasal broader than long, sometimes in contact with the frontal; the latter usually as long as, or a little shorter than, the frontoparietals and interparietal together, sometimes not longer than the frontoparietals, in contact with the second, or rarely first and second, supraoculars ; 4 supraoculars, second largest; 6 supraciliaries, first longest; frontoparietals distinct, as long as or longer than the interparietal, which usually entirely separates the parietals; a pair of nuchals; 4 labials anterior to the subocular, which is large and not narrower below. Ear-opening oval, as large as a lateral scale, or a little smaller, with three short pointed lobules anteriorly. Dorsal and nuchal scales with 3 or 5 keels, sometimes very feeble; 30 to 32 scales round the middle of the body, subequal. The adpressed limbs meet or slightly overlap, Subdigital lamellae unicarinate. Scales on upper surface of tibia mostly tricarinate. Tail 1.6 to 2.2 times the length of head and body. The coloration varies considerably, but a lateral black band, edged above and below with a whitish streak, is constant. Some (young) specimens black above, with seven light longitudinal lines ; others olive-brown with four black dorsal streaks, which may not extend further back than the nape; or a light black-edged vertebral band may be present; head-shields spotted or variegated with black; limbs and tail rufous; lower surfaces white."

"From snout to vent ; tail ."

Geographic range
Eutropis beddomei is found in southern India (Salem, Tinnevelly, Malabar, Mysore, etc.), the most northern locality known being southeastern Berar. It is also found in Sri Lanka.

The type locality is "Mysore".

References

Further reading
Blanford WT (1870). "Notes on some Reptilia and Amphibia from Central India". Journal of the Asiatic Society of Bengal 39: 335-376.
Boulenger GA (1887). Catalogue of the Lizards in the British Museum (Natural History). Second Edition. Volume III. ... Scincidæ, ... London: Trustees of the British Museum (Natural History). (Taylor and Francis, printers). xii + 575 pp. + Plates I-XL. (Mabuia beddomii, pp. 179–180).
Jerdon TC (1870). "Notes on Indian Herpetology". Proceedings of the Asiatic Society of Bengal March 1870: 66-85. ("Euprepes Beddomei [sic]", new species, p. 73).
Mausfeld P, Schmitz A, Böhme W, Misof B, Vrcibradic D, Freder C (2002). "Phylogenetic Affinities of Mabuya atlantica Schmidt, 1945, Endemic to the Atlantic Ocean Archipelago of Fernando de Noronha (Brazil): Necessity of Partitioning the Genus Mabuya Fitzinger, 1826 (Scincidae: Lygosominae)". Zoologischer Anzeiger 241: 281-293. (Eutropis beddomii, new combination).
Smith MA (1935). The Fauna of British India, Including Ceylon and Burma. Reptilia and Amphibia. Vol. II.—Sauria. London: Secretary of State for India in Council. (Taylor and Francis, printers). xiii + 440 pp. + Plate I + 2 maps. (Mabuya beddomii, pp. 274–275).

Eutropis
Reptiles described in 1870
Taxa named by Thomas C. Jerdon